Visayax is a genus of crabs in the family Xanthidae, containing the following species:

 Visayax estampadori Mendoza & Ng, 2008
 Visayax osteodictyon Mendoza & Ng, 2008

References

Xanthoidea